The 1946 Washington & Jefferson Presidents football team was an American football team that represented Washington & Jefferson College as an independent during the 1946 college football season. In their first season under head coach Henry Luecht, the Presidents compiled a 6–2 record and was outscored by a total of 150 to 46. 

The team featured a freshman African-American back, "Deacon Dan" Towler. Towler later played six seasons in the National Football League and was selected to play in four Pro Bowls.

The team played it home games at College Field in Washington, Pennsylvania.

Schedule

References

Washington and Jefferson
Washington & Jefferson Presidents football seasons
Washington and Jefferson Presidents football